Delaware State Museum Buildings, also known as Old Presbyterian Church Complex, is a historic museum complex located in Dover, Delaware. The complex consists of four buildings. They are the Old Presbyterian Church, brick chapel (1880), brick gas plant office building, and the Georgian-style Eldridge Reeves Johnson Memorial Building.  The Old Presbyterian Church was built in 1790, and is a two-story, three bay square brick early Federal style meeting house.  Buried in the adjacent cemetery are a number of prominent Delawareans including John M. Clayton (1796-1856) and John Haslet (c. 1727–1777).  The Eldridge Reeves Johnson Memorial Building houses the Johnson Victrola Museum.

It was added to the National Register of Historic Places in 1972.

See also 
 Delaware lunar sample displays

References

Buildings and structures on the National Register of Historic Places in Delaware
Georgian architecture in Delaware
Federal architecture in Delaware
Churches completed in 1790
Buildings and structures in Dover, Delaware
1790 establishments in Delaware
National Register of Historic Places in Dover, Delaware
18th-century Presbyterian church buildings in the United States